The 471st Tactical Electronic Warfare Squadron is an inactive unit of the United States Air Force.  It was formed in 1985 by the consolidation of the World War II 71st Liaison Squadron and the Cold War era 471st Fighter-Bomber Squadron of the Air Force Reserve.

History

World War II
The first predecessor of the squadron was the 71st Liaison Squadron, which was activated overseas at Ondal, India in June 1943.  The squadron served in India, Burma and China until the end of the war.  It was inactivated in India in December 1945.

Cold War
The 471st Fighter-Bomber Squadron was activated at Selfridge Air Force Base, Michigan in April 1954.  It trained with Republic F-84 Thunderjets until 1957, when its parent 439th Fighter-Bomber Group converted to a troop carrier unit.

In September 1985 the 71st Liaison Squadron and the 471st Fighter-Bomber Squadron were consolidated as the 471st Tactical Electronic Warfare Training Squadron.

Lineage
71st Liaison Squadron
 Constituted as the 71st Liaison Squadron on 17 June 1943
 Activated on 15 July 1943
 Inactivated on 8 December 1945
 Consolidated on 19 September 1985 with the 471st Fighter-Bomber Squadron as the 471st Tactical Electronic Warfare Training Squadron

471st Tactical Electronic Warfare Squadron
 Constituted as the 471st Fighter-Bomber Squadron
 Activated on 1 April 1954
 Inactivated on 1 July 1957
 Consolidated on 19 September 1985 with the 71st Liaison Squadron as the 471st Tactical Electronic Warfare Training Squadron

Assignments
 Tenth Air Force: 15 July 1943
 United States Army Forces, China-Burma-India: 19 August 1943 (attached to 5903d Combat Troops (later 5903d Area Command, Northern Combat Area Command) from c. Oct 1943
 Army Air Forces, India-Burma Sector: 2 March 1944 (remained attached to Northern Combat Area Command)
 Detachment attached to Y Force: November 1943 – c. 1 July 1944
 Tenth Air Force: 21 August 1944 (attached to 1st Liaison Group (Provisional) 19 August 1944 – 30 April 1945)
 Fourteenth Air Force: 6 July 1945 (attached to 14th AF Tactical Air Command 24 July 1945 – 1 August 1945)
 Tenth Air Force: 1 August 1945 – 8 December 1945
 439th Fighter-Bomber Group: 1 April 1954 – 1 July 1957

Stations

 Ondal, India, 15 July 1943
 Ramgarh, Bengal, India, 17 July 1943 (detachment at Ledo, Assam, India after 18 September 1943)
 Ledo, Assam, India, 26 October 1943 (detachment at Kunming Airfield, China November 1943 – c. 1 July 1944)
 Sahmaw Airfield, Burma, 15 October 1944
 Katha, Burma, 16 January 1945
 Myitkyina Airfield, Burma, 22 March 1945
 Dinjan Airfield, Assam, India, c. 24 April 1945 (air echelon remained at Myitkyina Airfield)
 Piardoba Airfield, Bengal, India, 12 May 1945 – 10 July 1945
 Kunming Airfield, China, 25 July 1945
 Liuchow Airfield, China, 21 August 1945
 Chihchiang Airfield, China, c. 7 October 1945
 Kunming Airfield, China, October 1945
 Salua Army Air Base, Bengal, India, 4 November 1945 – 8 December 1945
 Selfridge Air Force Base, Michigan, 1 April 1954 – 1 July 1957

Aircraft

 Stinson L-1 (O-49) Vigilant (1944–45)
 Piper L-4 Cub (1943–45)
 Stinson L-5 Sentinel (1944–45)
 Noorduyn UC-64 Norseman (1944–45)
 Republic F-84 Thunderjet (1954–57)

Campaigns

See also
 List of MAJCOM wings of the United States Air Force

References

Notes

Bibliography

Further reading
 

Military units and formations established in 1954
0471
Electronic warfare squadrons of the United States Air Force